Christian Lund Gytkjær (born 6 May 1990) is a Danish professional footballer who plays as a striker for  club Monza.

Early life 
Christian Gytkjær started his youth career playing for Roskilde, before moving on to Lyngby in 2005. In October 2007, he was invited for a trial at Liverpool in England with his brother, Frederik, ultimately nothing materialized from the visit. Gytkjær went on to be Lyngby's top scorer in 2007–08 for the under-18 side.

Club career

Lyngby Boldklub 
Gytkjær was called up to the Lyngby first team in the middle of 2008, signing a new contract keeping him at the club until 2010. He scored three goals in eight appearances in his debut season in the 1st Division. By the 2009–10 campaign, Gytkjær had become one of Lyngby's most anticipated talents to come through their youth system.

On 2 February 2010, it was confirmed Gytkjær would leave Lyngby when his contract expired in the summer to join Danish Cup winners Nordsjælland on a free transfer, signing a three-year contract, following in the footsteps of Andreas Bjelland, Andreas Laudrup and Morten Nordstrand, who had left Lyngby for the Farum-based club. While his future had been set, Gytkjær was still to play out the remainder of the 2009–10 season with Lyngby, where he was targeted by the supporters who disapproved in seeing another player their team had nurtured head over to neighboring rivals. The backlash was only increased when the player was photographed with an FCN shirt while still under contract to Lyngby.

Nordsjælland 
Christian Gytkjær made his debut for Nordsjælland in a 2–0 away defeat to Superliga champions Copenhagen on 14 August 2010, when he was brought into the team to replace Nicki Bille Nielsen, who was sold to Villarreal.

Lech Poznań 
On 28 June 2017, he signed a two-year contract with Ekstraklasa side Lech Poznań, with the option for an extra 12 months.

He made his debut for the club during the 2017–18 UEFA Europa League second qualifying round away game against FK Haugesund, which Lech lost 3–2. He scored his first (and second) goal for Lech in a 5–1 home win over Piast Gliwice in the third round of the 2017–18 season.

On 7 March 2019, he signed a contract extension, running until the end of the 2019–20 season.

On 19 July 2020, during his last game for Lech, he scored twice in a 4–0 home win against Jagiellonia Białystok and led the team to secure second place in the 2019–20 season. He finished the campaign as top scorer with 24 goals. He also won Forward of the Season award. During the three years at Lech Poznań, he played in 119 games and scored 65 goals, which made him the best foreign goalscorer in club's history.

Monza 
On 22 July 2020, Gytkjær joined newly-promoted Italian Serie B side Monza on a free transfer, signing a two-year contract with the option of a third. He made his debut on 3 October against Empoli, and scored his first goal on 31 October, converting a penalty kick against Cittadella. He renewed his expiring contract in February 2022 for one year.

With five goals in four 2021–22 Serie B promotion play-off games – including three goals in two final games against Pisa – Gytkjær helped Monza gain promotion to the Serie A for the first time in their history, and was awarded the play-off MVP award. He made his Serie A debut on 13 August 2022, as a substitute in a 2–1 home defeat to Torino. On 18 September, Gytkjær came on as a substitute and scored in an upset 1–0 win against Italian giants Juventus; it was Monza's first-ever Serie A win.

International career 
Gytkjær was part of the Denmark under-17 team that won the 2006 Nordic Championship in the Faroe Islands. He scored three goals in a 4–0 win over England in the final.

Personal life 
Gytkjær's younger brother, Frederik, also is a footballer.

Career statistics

Club

International 

Scores and results list Denmark's goal tally first, score column indicates score after each Gytkjær goal.

Honours 
FC Nordsjælland
 Danish Cup: 2010–11

Rosenborg
 Tippeligaen: 2016
 Norwegian Football Cup: 2016

Denmark U17
 Nordic Championship: 2006

Individual
 Tippeligaen top scorer: 2016
 Ekstraklasa top scorer: 2019–20
 Tippeligaen Striker of the Year: 2016
 Ekstraklasa Forward of the Season: 2019–20
 Serie B play-offs MVP: 2021–22

References

External links 

 Rosenborg BK official profile 
 AC Monza official profile 
 Christian Gytkjær at rbkmedia.no 
 
 
 

1990 births
Living people
People from Roskilde
Danish men's footballers
Denmark youth international footballers
Denmark international footballers
Association football forwards
Lyngby Boldklub players
FC Nordsjælland players
Akademisk Boldklub players
Sandnes Ulf players
FK Haugesund players
Rosenborg BK players
TSV 1860 Munich players
Lech Poznań players
A.C. Monza players
Danish 1st Division players
Danish Superliga players
Eliteserien players
2. Bundesliga players
Ekstraklasa players
Serie B players
Serie A players
Danish expatriate men's footballers
Expatriate footballers in Norway
Danish expatriate sportspeople in Norway
Expatriate footballers in Germany
Danish expatriate sportspeople in Germany
Expatriate footballers in Poland
Danish expatriate sportspeople in Poland
Expatriate footballers in Italy
Danish expatriate sportspeople in Italy
Sportspeople from Region Zealand